Posht Marz (also known as Posht Marz-e ‘Alīābād) is a village in Dowlatabad Rural District, in the Central District of Jiroft County, Kerman Province, Iran. At the 2006 census, its population was 401, in 100 families.

References 

Populated places in Jiroft County